Aberdeen Street is a street in the Perth suburbs of Perth and Northbridge that runs from a cul-de-sac west of Lord Street in the east to a cul-de-sac between Fitzgerald Street and the Mitchell Freeway in the west. The street has 42 locally listed places of significance, 18 of which are also listed on the State Register of Heritage Places.

Tannery 
It had been the location of The Perth Tannery at number 257.

History 
Aberdeen Street was named after the Earl of Aberdeen, who was Foreign Secretary in the Duke of Wellington's Cabinet when Western Australia was founded. A separate Aberdeen Road in East Perth was shown on the first street map of Perth issued in 1838, but a later survey by John Septimus Roe of this part of the Swan River Colony had removed that thoroughfare by 1845, and the name was transferred to the present Aberdeen Street.

Aberdeen Street originally extended from Beaufort Street in the east to Charles Street in the west, after which it continued west as Duke Street (which extended west to Sutherland Street, continuing as Stone Street). By 1925, Duke Street had been incorporated into Aberdeen Street. 

A bill was introduced in 1913 to extend Aberdeen Street eastward from its previous terminus at Beaufort Street to Pier Street and make it continue east as an existing street, Short Street, which ran from Pier Street to Lord Street. However, this extension was ultimately not constructed until the mid-1970s.

As part of the construction of the Mitchell Freeway in the 1970s, overpass bridges were constructed over Aberdeen Street for the Charles Street freeway entry and exit ramps. As the Mitchell Freeway reached Leederville in the late 1970s, Aberdeen Street was extended westward to Vincent Street. In the mid-2000s, this western section of Aberdeen Street was renamed to Leederville Parade.

The 1999 replacement of the Lord Street level crossing with a road bridge required the severance of Short Street from Lord Street, with Short Street becoming a cul-de-sac before Lord Street. Some time after this, the entire remaining stretch of Short Street was subsumed into Aberdeen Street.

Due to the construction of the Graham Farmer Freeway from 1996 to 2000, Aberdeen Street was severed into two discontinuous sections on either side of Charles Street: the eastern side terminating at a cul-de-sac in front of St Brigid's Church, just west of Fitzgerald Street; and the western side terminating at a cul-de-sac just west of the Charles Street northbound exit ramp from the Mitchell Freeway. West of Fitzgerald Street, the short cul-de-sac was redeveloped into Piazza Nanni, a parkland piazza, which opened on 27 June 1999.

By November 2004, the surviving Duke Street portion of Aberdeen Street had been renamed to Old Aberdeen Place.

Intersections

Notes

References

Streets in Northbridge, Western Australia